Paralimnini is a tribe of leafhoppers in the subfamily Deltocephalinae. Paralimnini contains 139 genera and over 900 species divided into two subtribes: Aglenina and Paralimnina. The tribe has a cosmopolitan distribution.

Genera 
There are currently 139 described genera divided into two subtribes:

Currently placed in Paralimnini but unplaced to subtribe:

 Paraphysifer 

Subtribe Aglenina 

 Aglena 

Subtribe Paralimnina

References 

Deltocephalinae
Insect tribes